Arminka Helić, Baroness Helić (born 20 April 1968 in Gračanica, SFR Yugoslavia) is a British Conservative politician from Bosnia and Herzegovina, who served as Special Adviser to the former Foreign Secretary William Hague.

In 2014, Arminka Helić was nominated to the House of Lords by David Cameron. She was created a Life Peer on 18 September 2014 taking the title Baroness Helić, of Millbank in the City of Westminster and was introduced to the House of Lords on 24 November 2014.

Background
Arminka Helić is a Bosnia and Herzegovina foreign policy expert who became a Conservative adviser after fleeing the Yugoslav conflict of the 1990s.

Foreign policy adviser
Helić has advised numerous Conservatives in opposition and government from 1998 building up considerable expertise. She has been described by Matthew D’Ancona as "one of the most impressive foreign policy experts in the Government." Known for her discretion, there is little in the public domain on her personal views, although she is pro-American. According to a leaked dispatch from Richard LeBaron, Deputy Head of the US Mission in London, she shares  William Hague's pronounced pro-U.S. views and described the United States as "the essential country."

Global Sexual Violence Initiative
Helić is credited with persuading UK Foreign Secretary William Hague to launch the UK's Global Sexual Violence Initiative. Hague worked with Angelina Jolie to draw attention to the issue at a four-day summit in 2014. In October 2017, Helić was named as one of London's most influential figures for her refugee work.

Trust Fund for Victims
In November 2015, Helić was elected to the Board of the Trust Fund for Victims as the representative of Western European Countries and Other States. The Trust, established under the auspices of the Rome Statute of the International Criminal Court, encourages restorative justice through the provision of assistance to victims of crimes that fall within the Court's jurisdiction.

Parliamentary work
In May 2016, Baroness Helić was appointed to the House of Lords International Relations Committee.

References

1968 births
Living people
Bosniaks of Bosnia and Herzegovina
Bosnia and Herzegovina Muslims
British special advisers
Conservative Party (UK) officials
Conservative Party (UK) life peers
British Muslims
Bosnia and Herzegovina emigrants to England
Naturalised citizens of the United Kingdom
Life peeresses created by Elizabeth II